Jesse Hutch (born February 12, 1981) is a Canadian-born American film and television actor.  He spends his time travelling between the USA and Canada. He worked on the television show American Dreams as Jimmy Riley, romantic interest of main character Meg Pryor (Brittany Snow). In 2007, he played a major character on the Sci-Fi Channel TV-movie Termination Point. Most recently, he had a recurring role in the second season of Arrow and the second season of Batwoman.

Life and career
Hutch grew up in various places across Canada. He attended an Outdoor Education Program at Algonquin College. He was a white water raft guide for four years before beginning to pursue a career as an actor.  He first appeared in character roles in productions such as Dark Angel, Smallville and Taken.

His lead role in the series About a Girl aired on The N network.

In 2010, Hutch guest starred on The CW Freshmen Hit Drama Hellcats, appearing in one episode.

Filmography

Film

Television

References

External links
 

1981 births
Living people
Male actors from Alberta
Canadian male film actors
Canadian male television actors
Canadian people of Syrian descent
Canadian people of Arab descent